Rosse may refer to:

People
 Eric Rosse, American record producer and composer
 Frederick Rosse (1867–1940), English composer
 Herman Rosse (1887–1965), Dutch-born American architect, painter, theatrical designer and art director
 John Ross (bishop of Exeter) (1719–1792), also spelled Rosse
 Mary Rosse (1813–1885), British astronomer and photographer
 Susan Penelope Rosse (1652–1700), English painter

Other uses
 Earl of Rosse, two titles in the Peerage of Ireland
 Rosse (crater), a lunar impact crater
 Rosse Bay, a bay of Qikiqtaaluk Region, Nunavut, Canada

See also
 Ross (disambiguation)